Tonics and Twisted Chasers is a standalone album by American indie rock band Guided by Voices initially released as a 19-track limited-edition fanclub-only vinyl LP in 1996. The following year, it was released in a limited CD edition, with five additional tracks. The album was primarily recorded by principal songwriters Robert Pollard and Tobin Sprout.

The song "Jellyfish Reflector" was referenced in the Homestar Runner short "Sbemail 150?!?"

Track listing
All songs written by Robert Pollard and Tobin Sprout unless otherwise noted.

 "Satellite" – 1:42
 "Dayton, Ohio—19 Something and 5" – 1:45
 "Is She Ever?" – 1:03
 "My Thoughts Are a Gas" (Fucked Up Version) (R. Pollard) - 1:18
 "Knock 'Em Flyin'" (R. Pollard) – 1:04
 "The Top Chick's Silver Chord" – 1:22 [called "Top Chick Silver Chord" on the CD version]
 "Key Losers" – 2:27
 "Ha Ha Man" – 0:39
 "Wingtip Repair" – 0:58
 "At the Farms" – 2:30
 "Unbaited Vicar of Scorched Earth" – 2:10
 "Optional Bases Opposed" – 1:38
 "Look, It's Baseball" – 1:21
 "Maxwell Jump" – 0:46
 "The Stir-Crazy Pornographer" – 2:16
 "158 Years of Beautiful Sex" (R. Pollard) – 1:21
 "Universal Nurse Finger" – 1:04
 "Sadness Is to End" – 0:56 [called "Sadness to the End" on the CD version] (Sprout)
 "Reptilian Beauty Secrets" (R. Pollard) – 1:40

Extra tracks on CD version 
 "Long as the Block Is Black" (R. Pollard) – 1:16
 "Jellyfish Reflector" (Kevin Fennell, Mitch Mitchell, R. Pollard, Sprout) – 1:33
 "The Kite Surfer" (R. Pollard) – 1:47
 "Girl from the Sun" (R. Pollard) – 1:37
 "The Candyland Riots" (R. Pollard) – 2:08

Personnel 
The credits do not give specific instruments played by each individual, but rather list every performer who appeared on the release in any capacity.

Guided by Voices 
 Robert Pollard 
 Tobin Sprout

References

1996 albums
Guided by Voices albums